Lupinus croceus is a species of lupine known by the common name saffron-flowered lupine. It is endemic to the northernmost mountains of California, including the Klamath Mountains, where it grows in generally dry, rocky habitat. The inflorescence is a raceme of many flowers, sometimes arranged in whorls. Each flower is just over a centimeter long and bright yellow to orange in color.

External links
Jepson Manual Treatment
Photo gallery
Turner Photographics

croceus
Endemic flora of California
Flora of the Klamath Mountains
Taxa named by Alice Eastwood
Flora without expected TNC conservation status